Lidia Lwow-Eberle nom de guerre "Ewa" (14 November 1920 – 5 January 2021) was a Russian born Polish nationalist and paramedic. She was arrested by the communist authorities and she was imprisoned "for life". She later married and became an archaeologist.

Life
Lwow-Eberle was born in the Russian town of Plyos in 1920. Her parents were Barbara (born Tuganove) and Leon Lvov. In 1921 her family moved to Poland where her father taught in a secondary school. In time her father became an agronomist. After 1930 her family moved again where her father worked near Vilnius. She graduated in 1939 when she got to know Janina Wasałojć and Zygmunt Szendzielarz.

By 1943 she was part of a unit commanded by Antoni Burzyński where she was known as "Ewa". The unit was captured and about 80 of the force were killed. Although she was born a Russian, this was not important at the time. The important point was that she was working to create a Polish state.

During the war she served as a paramedic in one unit who were captured and then she joined her friend Janina Wasałojć as a nurse in the Home Army 5th Wilno Brigade which was commanded by another acquaintance Major Zygmunt Szendzielarz. She rose to be a second lieutenant after fighting the Germans near Worziany in 1944 and then three days later a Soviet partisan group. She was wounded in the battle with the Germans. In February 1945, Major Szendzielarz's wife died and after that time he became her partner.

They were both arrested on 30 June 1948 by the communist authorities. She was in Osielec, when she was arrested and the others arrested included  and his wife , Captain Henryk Borowski and Lt. Col. Antoni Olechnowicz. She was sentenced to life imprisonment in 1950 and Major Szendzielarz was sentenced to death. He was killed on 9 February 1951 in Mokotów Prison.

She and Wanda Czarnecka-Minkiewicz were released in 1956 and she set out on a new career as an archaeologist. She married a historian Jan Eberle in 1961 and she graduated in archaeology in 1962. She worked at the Museum of Warsaw taking credit for setting up the Museum of the Guild of Leather-based Crafts.

In 2013 it was announced that the authorities had discovered unmarked graves in "Meadows in Powązki" in Warsaw. Amongst them was her post war partner who was identified using DNA comparisons with his close relatives.

Lwow-Eberle died in Warsaw aged 100 years old on 5 January 2021. Her military funeral was in Warsaw on 22 January at the Powązki Military Cemetery.

References

1920 births
2021 deaths
People from Privolzhsky District, Ivanovo Oblast
20th-century Polish archaeologists
Polish centenarians
Home Army members
Polish women in World War II resistance
Burials at Powązki Military Cemetery
Polish women archaeologists
Lidia Lwow-Eberle